Recourse Technologies, Inc., was a network security company based in Redwood City, California.  Founded by Frank Huerta and Michael Lyle in February 1999, it was later acquired by Symantec on July 17, 2002, for US$135 million.

Recourse's products included ManHunt, a network intrusion detection system and security event manager, and ManTrap, a
honeypot.

References

Software companies based in California
Gen Digital acquisitions
Defunct software companies of the United States